Gudakesh Motie (born 29 March 1995) is a Guyanese cricketer who plays for Guyana in West Indian domestic cricket. He is a left-arm orthodox bowler. He made his international debut for the West Indies cricket team in December 2021.

Career
Motie played for the West Indies under-19s at the 2014 Under-19 World Cup in the United Arab Emirates. He made his first-class debut for Guyana in November 2015, playing against the Windward Islands in the 2015–16 Regional Four Day Competition. In just his second game, against the Leeward Islands, Motie took 6/20 and 5/85 (match figures of 11/105), and was named man of the match. He also took 6/79 in the following match against Barbados, and added a fourth five-wicket haul for the season two games later, taking 6/33 against Jamaica.

In October 2019, he was named in Guyana's squad for the 2019–20 Regional Super50 tournament. He was the leading wicket taker in the super50 series of 2021, with a total of 16 wickets. He made his Twenty20 debut on 2 September 2021, for the Guyana Amazon Warriors in the 2021 Caribbean Premier League.

In November 2021, Motie was named in the West Indies' One Day International (ODI) and Twenty20 International (T20I) squads for their series against Pakistan. He made his T20I debut on 16 December 2021, for the West Indies against Pakistan. In December 2021, he was named in the West Indies' ODI squad for their series against Ireland.

In May 2022, in the third round of the 2021–22 West Indies Championship, Motie scored his maiden century in first-class cricket, with 110 runs against Barbados. The following month, he was named in the West Indies' Test squad for their series against Bangladesh. He made his Test debut on 16 June 2022, for the West Indies against Bangladesh. Later the same month, Motie was named in the West Indies' ODI squad, also for their series against Bangladesh. He made his ODI debut on 10 July 2022, for the West Indies against Bangladesh.

Notes

References

External links
 Player profile and statistics from ESPNcricinfo
 Player profile and statistics from CricketArchive

1995 births
Living people
West Indies Test cricketers
West Indies One Day International cricketers
West Indies Twenty20 International cricketers
Guyana cricketers
Guyanese cricketers
Sportspeople from Georgetown, Guyana